Jake Cabell is an American football coach and former player.

Playing career
Cabell played cornerback for the Nebraska Cornhuskers under head coach Bob Devaney.  He was recruited in the class of 1974 and played during the 1975 and 1976 seasons.  Cabel was a junior college transfer because he played for one year at Ferrum College in Ferrum, Virginia, where he earned an associate degree. Before that, he played his freshman year at North Carolina Central.

Coaching career

Southwestern
Cabell was the 24th football coach for the Southwestern College Moundbuilders in Winfield, Kansas, and held that position for the 1992 season.  His coaching record at Southwestern was five wins and four losses.

Assistant coaching
Cabell has been an assistant coach at various colleges for over 30 years, including Oregon State University, Eastern Washington University, and Tennessee State University, where he served one game in an authority capacity because of the suspension of the head coach.  He was an assistant coach at North Carolina Central University in 2010. 2014-(DC)whitwell high school

Head coaching record

References

External links
 North Carolina Central profile

Year of birth missing (living people)
Living people
American football cornerbacks
Eastern Washington Eagles football coaches
Ferrum Panthers football players
Iowa Wesleyan Tigers football coaches
Nebraska Cornhuskers football coaches
Nebraska Cornhuskers football players
North Carolina Central Eagles football coaches
North Carolina Central Eagles football players
Oregon State Beavers football coaches
Southwestern Moundbuilders football coaches
Tennessee State Tigers football coaches
Texas Southern Tigers football coaches
Western Illinois Leathernecks football coaches
High school football coaches in Tennessee
African-American coaches of American football
African-American players of American football
21st-century African-American people